Missouri City, also known as Missouri Flats, was a town in Colorado.

History 
Missouri City was founded in 1860. According to the 1860 census, 528 males and 69 females lived there, for a total population of 597. It had a post office from 1860 to 1863. Today, the only evidence of its existence is a single grave that makes up the Missouri City Cemetery in Gilpin County, Colorado.

Geography 
The site of Missouri City is located next to Central City Parkway near Central City, Colorado.

References

Ghost towns in Colorado